Donald R. Laub Sr. (born January 1, 1935) is an American retired plastic surgeon and founder of Interplast, which led multidisciplinary teams on reconstructive surgery missions to developing countries.

Education
Laub completed his undergraduate studies at Marquette University and earned an MD from the Marquette University School of Medicine in 1960. After completing his internship at the Yale School of Medicine, he moved westward to Stanford University, where he assumed an assistant professorship and co-founded a 6-year integrated surgical residency program  as well as the Stanford Primary Care Associate Program. He then served as chief of Plastic Surgery at Stanford University School of Medicine from 1968 to 1980, before entering private practice.

Laub's experience at Stanford University School of Medicine operating on Antonio, a 13-year-old boy from Mexico who was born with cleft lip, led him to pursue becoming an Adjunct Clinical Professor at Stanford and to found Interplast, an organization dedicated to assisting others from similarly underprivileged backgrounds through medicine.

Accomplishments

Interplast
In 1969, Laub founded Interplast (now called ReSurge International), an organization devoted to transforming lives through the art of plastic and reconstructive surgery in under-resourced areas.  He became the first academic to develop and lead multidisciplinary teams on humanitarian surgical trips to developing countries. Since its inception, Interplast has provided tens of thousands of life-altering operations gratis, developing a network of healthcare professionals willing to devote their talent to humanitarian purposes. The organization's choice to embrace not having a core organization has led to dozens of independent humanitarian medical organizations worldwide, including Interplast Germany, Interplast Turkey, Interplast Holland, Interplast Italy, Interplast Florida, Interplast West Virginia, Interplast Australia, OneHeart World-Wide, and IVUMed. In their unique ways, they all carry Laub’s vision of healing the world through plastic surgery.

Aside from his notable accomplishments with Interplast, Laub has contributed novel surgical techniques to his field of specialty. He made one of the first academic investigations into the efficacy of treating gender dysphoria with surgery.  He pioneered the rectosigmoid vaginoplasty.  He also invented the metoidioplasty and the post-modern phalloplasty. These innovations elevated phalloplasty by allowing constructed male structures to naturally urinate and engage in sexual intercourse. Laub’s further professional achievements include developing Q switched ruby laser tattoo removal  and the use of medical chemicals to reduce risk of skin cancer while improving cosmetic appearance. From 1981 to 1983, he served as the second President of HBIGDA, now known as the World Professional Association for Transgender Health. Over the course of his career as a plastic surgeon working in collaboration with Stanford and other organizations, he managed around 2,000 transgender patients, delivering his new innovations to those who needed them.

Later life
In 2000, Laub was diagnosed with aggressive intravascular CNS large B cell lymphoma. His struggle with lymphoma led him to pursue and develop knowledge regarding healthier living. He assisted James B. Johnson in developing the "alternate day calorie restriction diet", which he documented in the controversial and non-peer reviewed journal Medical Hypotheses. The diet prescribes a program for weight loss and longevity based on SIRT-1 gene activation. While calorie restriction in various forms has shown promise in clinical trials, evidence of the long-term effects of such diets is nonexistent.

After completing 159 surgical trips to developing countries, Laub has focused on mentoring undergraduate and medical students and conveying the value of students in the field of international health. He has been involved in teaching several courses at Stanford University, including Principles and Practice of International Humanitarian Medicine, and currently maintains a blog Many People, Many Passports, which details aspects of his career and livelihood, as well as providing in-depth articles on other health care professionals and people whom he worked with. He currently resides in Redwood City, California with his wife Judy.

References

External links
 www.interplast.org
 ReSurge International
 Stanford Plastic Surgery
 Many People, Many Passports

1935 births
Living people
American plastic surgeons
Marquette University alumni
Surgeons specializing in transgender medicine
Yale School of Medicine faculty